The AFL Rising Star is an Australian rules football award presented annually to the player adjudged the best young player in the Australian Football League (AFL) for the year. An eligible player is nominated for the award each round during the AFL's regular season, and a panel of experts vote for the winner at the end of the season.

During the 2016 season, the award was sponsored by National Australia Bank. The winner was announced in a presentation held at Crown Palladium on 6 September 2016 and broadcast on subscription television by Fox Footy. The voting panel for the season consisted of ten members, all of whom were AFL officials or former players: Kevin Bartlett, Luke Darcy, Mark Evans, Danny Frawley, Glen Jakovich, Cameron Ling, Gillon McLachlan, Matthew Richardson, Warren Tredrea and Kevin Sheehan.

The winner was Sydney player Callum Mills, who polled 49 votes. Mills was the third Sydney recipient to win the award, and the first New South Wales–born winner. The club that garnered the most individual nominations this season was Melbourne with four players nominated for the award, a record for the club. Essendon player Orazio Fantasia, who received a nomination in round 17, was previously nominated for the award in the 2015 season—becoming the tenth player ever to be nominated twice for a Rising Star award.

Nominations

Final voting

References 

Afl Rising Star, 2016
Australian rules football-related lists